The Tournoi international de l'Exposition Universelle de Paris (the international tournament of the Paris exhibition) was an international club football tournament which took place from May to June 1937. It was arranged to coincide with the international exhibition being held in France that year. Eight clubs from around Europe were invited to participate. The tournament was won by Italian champions Bologna, who beat English side Chelsea 4–1 in the final.

Tournament

Quarter-finals 
Matches played were played on 30 May respectively in Le Havre, Strasbourg, Antibes and Paris

1 Chelsea won on coin toss

Semi finals 
Matches were played on 3 June respectively in Paris and Lille

Third-place play-off
Match played 5 June in Saint-Ouen

Final 
Match played 6 June in Saint-Ouen

Notes

External links
Tournoi International de l'Expo Universelle de Paris 1937 at RSSSF
 Paris 1937: Final, Bologna 4-1 Chelsea

Defunct football competitions in France
1937 in association football
Defunct international club association football competitions in Europe
Exposition Internationale des Arts et Techniques dans la Vie Moderne